David Emrys Lewis (1887 – 12 March 1954) was a Welsh poet and journalist.

He was born in 1887 at Machynlleth which was where he attended school. He started his career in journalism by researching and writing for Montgomeryshire County Times but soon moved to Port Talbot in 1916 where he became a representative of Cambrian Daily Leader. He later joined the staff of the Western Mail but was also a part of several other newspapers in South Wales. He won the crown at Neath National Eisteddfod in 1918. In his lifetime, he married a woman named Margaret who was also from Machynlleth. They had two sons.

Lewis died due to a grave illness at Gendros, Swansea, on 12 March 1954, at age 67.

References 

1887 births
1954 deaths
Welsh male poets
Welsh journalists
People from Machynlleth
Date of birth missing